The Medici Madonna is an oil-on-panel painting by the Netherlandish artist Rogier van der Weyden, dating from around 1460–1464 and housed in the Städel, Frankfurt, Germany.

The work is known to have been commissioned by the Medici family in Florence, as testified by the Florentine coat of arms with a red lily at the center of the lower step. The work has been variously dated from 1450–1451, when the artist travelled to Rome visiting several Italian courts, or from 1460–1464, the same years of the Lamentation of Christ, inspired by Beato Angelico and now at the Uffizi.

Description
Within a gold ground for the sky, van der Weyden painted a baldachin lined with precious damask cloth, under which are the Virgin with Child, St. Peter, St. John the Baptist (patron saint of Florence), St. Cosmas (a protector of the House of Medici), and St. Damian.  Cosmas is portrayed while putting a coin in a handbag hanging from his belt, a reference of his legend, according to which he had accepted a small sum for  a medical performance, causing rage in his brother Damian.

In the foreground is a still life with the artist's typical attention to natural details. In the centre is a gilt metallic amphora, in which are several lilies: the white ones symbolize the Virgin's purity, while the red ones are another reference to Florence.

Sources

 Städel: Mix technique

Paintings by Rogier van der Weyden
1460s paintings
Paintings of the Madonna and Child
Paintings in the collection of the Städel
Paintings depicting John the Baptist
Paintings depicting Saint Peter
Paintings of Saints Cosmas and Damian
Angels in art
Books in art